Our Biggest Thing Ever is the studio album by Indonesian alternative rock band Last Child, released in 2012. In marketing this album, Last Child and the record label working with KFC that this album will be circulated in all KFC stores in Indonesia.

Track listing 

2012 albums